The Girl on a Bulldozer is a 2022 South Korean film directed by Park Yi-woong, starring Kim Hye-yoon, Park Hyuk-kwon, and Oh Man-seok. It tells the story of a daughter who digs up her father's whereabouts after a sudden accident. It was released theatrically on April 7, 2022.

Synopsis
19-year-old girl Hye-young digs into the hidden truth about the sudden car accident of her father and clashes with herself to protect her home and her brother.

Cast 
 Kim Hye-yoon as Goo Hye-young
 Park Hyuk-kwon as Bon-jin, Hye-young's father
 Oh Man-seok as Choi Young-hwan
 Yesung as Go Yoo-seok, a detective in charge of Bon-jin's accident
 Park Si-woo as Hye-jeok, Hye-young's younger brother

Release 
The Girl on a Bulldozer was screened at 26th Busan International Film Festival in October 2021 and is being screened at 2022 Florence Korean Film Festival in April 2022. It was released in theaters on April 7, 2022.

Awards and nominations

References

External links
  
 
 
 

2022 films
2020s Korean-language films
2020s South Korean films
South Korean mystery drama films
Films impacted by the COVID-19 pandemic